Arnolds Baumanis (born 3 May 1901, date of death unknown) was a Latvian wrestler. He competed in the Greco-Roman light heavyweight event at the 1924 Summer Olympics.

References

External links
 

1901 births
Year of death missing
Olympic wrestlers of Latvia
Wrestlers at the 1924 Summer Olympics
Latvian male sport wrestlers
Place of birth missing